Upper Lake is a census-designated place (CDP) in Lake County, California, United States. The population was 1,052 at the 2010 census, up from 989 at the 2000 census. The Habematolel Pomo of Upper Lake are headquartered here.

Etymology
This community was formerly named Upper Clear Lake and Upperlake. The Upper Clear Lake post office opened in 1871, changed its name to Upper Lake in 1875, to Upperlake in 1905, and then back to Upper Lake in 1906.

History

The settlement began in 1854 or 1856, when William B. Elliott opened a blacksmith's shop. About ten years later, in 1866, a man named Bukofsky built a store, followed by another blacksmith shop built by Caspar Sweikert. A hotel was started by Henry Taylor. A grist mill was built in 1858 and closed in 1867. A second grist mill was built in 1875. The community grew as cattle stock, alfalfa and bean canneries became the main economic draws.

Upper Lake was a hub to most activities in the Northern part of Lake County.  In 1860, when Upper Lake was known as Upper Clear Lake, there existed a  toll road between the town and Lower Lake which routed through Lakeport.  In 1865, the "Blue Lakes Wagon Road Co." completed a toll road which connected Upper Lake to Ukiah. In 1872 the Upper Lake & Clover Valley Toll Road Co." built an improved route that connected Bartlett Springs. Bartlett Springs sat in the high mountains East of Upper Lake and had a toll road running East into the Sacramento valley.  These toll roads became the major route to move people in and out of Lake County. Folks from around the world could take a train to Hopland, then take a stagecoach to Lakeport. From Lakeport they would take a steamboat across Clear Lake to Bartlett Landing.  The Wharf was located along the shoreline just East of Upper Lake. From there they would take a stagecoach via Upper Lake up to Bartlett Springs Resort.  Travelers could also take a train from the San Francisco Bay area into the Sacramento Valley and then take a stage into Lake County via Bartlett Springs and Upper Lake.  By the early 1890s, all major routes into and out of Lake County were toll roads.

Geography

Climate
Upper Lake has a Hot-summer Mediterranean climate (Csa) according to the Köppen climate classification system.

Demographics

2010

At the 2010 census Upper Lake had a population of 1,052. The racial makeup of Upper Lake was 842 (80.0%) White, 7 (0.7%) African American, 33 (3.1%) Native American, 7 (0.7%) Asian, 0 (0.0%) Pacific Islander, 104 (9.9%) from other races, and 59 (5.6%) from two or more races. Hispanic or Latino of any race were 242 people (23.0%).

The census reported that 1,043 people (99.1% of the population) lived in households, 9 (0.9%) lived in non-institutionalized group quarters, and no one was institutionalized.

There were 390 households, 142 (36.4%) had children under the age of 18 living in them, 172 (44.1%) were opposite-sex married couples living together, 54 (13.8%) had a female householder with no husband present, 34 (8.7%) had a male householder with no wife present.  There were 47 (12.1%) unmarried opposite-sex partnerships, and 3 (0.8%) same-sex married couples or partnerships. 100 households (25.6%) were one person and 44 (11.3%) had someone living alone who was 65 or older. The average household size was 2.67.  There were 260 families (66.7% of households); the average family size was 3.18.

The age distribution was 280 people (26.6%) under the age of 18, 96 people (9.1%) aged 18 to 24, 252 people (24.0%) aged 25 to 44, 286 people (27.2%) aged 45 to 64, and 138 people (13.1%) who were 65 or older.  The median age was 36.3 years. For every 100 females, there were 91.3 males.  For every 100 females age 18 and over, there were 84.7 males.

There were 440 housing units at an average density of 260.8 per square mile, of the occupied units 267 (68.5%) were owner-occupied and 123 (31.5%) were rented. The homeowner vacancy rate was 3.2%; the rental vacancy rate was 6.8%.  683 people (64.9% of the population) lived in owner-occupied housing units and 360 people (34.2%) lived in rental housing units.

2000
At the 2000 census there were 989 people, 389 households, and 259 families in the CDP. The racial makeup of the CDP was 84.23% White, 0.81% African American, 4.35% Native American, 1.72% Asian, 6.07% from other races, and 2.83% from two or more races. Hispanic or Latino of any race were 14.86%.

Of the 389 households 28.8% had children under the age of 18 living with them, 46.5% were married couples living together, 13.6% had a female householder with no husband present, and 33.4% were non-families. 27.8% of households were composed of one person and 15.4% were composed of one person aged 65 or older.  The average household size was 2.50 and the average family size was 3.05.

The age distribution was 26.5% under the age of 18, 10.3% from 18 to 24, 23.3% from 25 to 44, 22.3% from 45 to 64, and 17.6% 65 or older.  The median age was 38 years. For every 100 females, there were 92.0 males.  For every 100 females age 18 and over, there were 84.5 males.

The median household income was $22,143 and the median family income  was $33,393. Males had a median income of $21,964 versus $17,188 for females. The per capita income for the CDP was $11,670.  About 23.8% of families and 25.5% of the population were below the poverty line, including 23.7% of those under age 18 and 17.2% of those age 65 or over.

Economy

The early economy of Upper Lake comprised canning beans, growing alfalfa and raising cattle.

Canned beans

During the late 19th century, canned beans developed into the primary economy for Upper Lake in the mid-20th century. The first cannery, which employed 400 people annually, was built in 1897 by A. Mendenhall.

The first cannery was actually built by Mr. Henry Van Wambold.  He built his "Blue Lakes Cannery" in 1895 and Mr. Mendenhall followed with his "Clear Lake Cannery" in 1897. This information is found in the State of California archives which show the application paperwork along with the trademark labels that were issued by California for each of these canneries.  The name "Blue Lake" green bean was developed near the shores of the Blue Lakes of Lake County, near Upper Lake.  Both these canneries were bought out in 1927 and were then renamed the "Lake County Cannery". The Lake County Cannery continued in operation until 1968.

Government

Education

One of the first schools in Lake County was located in Upper Lake. The first teacher was J.W. Mackall, a former cashier at Farmers' Savings Bank.

Notable people

Benjamin Dewell, a member of the Bear Flag Rebellion, settled in Upper Lake, becoming the first permanent white settler, along with his wife Celia, in 1854.

References

External links
 Information webpage on Upper Lake, California

Census-designated places in Lake County, California
Populated places established in 1856
Census-designated places in California